Jānis Straume (born 27 August 1962 in Sigulda, Latvian SSR) is a former Latvian politician for For Fatherland and Freedom/LNNK (TB/LNNK).  He was the fourth Speaker of the Saeima (1998–2002) since 1991.

Straume was a leading member of a number of organisations in the Latvian independence movement, including Helsinki-86, the Latvian National Independence Movement, the Citizens' Congress, and the 18th November Union.

When the 18th November Union merged into For Fatherland and Freedom, he became a member of that party.  He served as the Speaker of the Saeima from 1998 to 2002, during the 7th Saeima.  He was chairman of the TB/LNNK from 2002 to 2006, during the 8th Saeima, when he was also Deputy Chairman of the Saeima.

Footnotes

|-

1962 births
Living people
People from Sigulda
Latvian National Independence Movement politicians
For Fatherland and Freedom/LNNK politicians
Speakers of the Saeima
Deputies of the 5th Saeima
Deputies of the 6th Saeima
Deputies of the 7th Saeima
Deputies of the 8th Saeima
Riga Stradiņš University alumni